Gong Hyo-suk (born 1 January 1986) is a South Korean cyclist, who most recently rode for UCI Continental team .

He is married to fencing star Nam Hyun-hee.

Major results
2009
2nd Overall Tour of Japan
2010
 Tour de Korea
1st Stages 6 & 9
2nd Overall Tour de Langkawi
2012
2nd Road race, National Road Championships

References

External links

1986 births
Living people
South Korean male cyclists